Wagner Dream is an opera by Jonathan Harvey, premiered in 2007, to a libretto by Jean-Claude Carrière, which intertwines events on the last day of the life of Richard Wagner with elements from a fragmentary opera sketch by Wagner himself, Die Sieger (The Victors).

Background
Die Sieger was drafted between 1856 and 1858, at a period when Wagner had become greatly interested in Buddhism. It is based on legends which Wagner discovered in Eugène Burnouf's 1844 Introduction to the History of Buddhism. Wagner planned a production of this work for 1870 in his programme for King Ludwig II of Bavaria but never progressed it – (however elements of the story persist in his opera Parsifal).

Harvey described some of the processes he used in creating Wagner Dream. These include the use of a French horn and a sampled trombone playing deep notes at the opera's commencement, representing boat sirens on the Grand Canal. The composer also visited Chamonix to sample a thunderclap, used to preface an argument between Wagner and his wife.

Narrative structure and scoring
The story tells of the love of the outcast chandala Prakriti for the monk Ananda. Although both are ostracized by the other monks, Buddha permits their chaste union and allows Prakriti to join the monastic community. Wagner Dream intersperses the Prakriti/Ananda story with the events surrounding Wagner's death in Venice. As Wagner dies from a heart attack, he recalls the opera he never completed. Whilst the "Indian" roles are all sung, the members of the Wagner household, including his wife Cosima and the soprano Carrie Pringle (with whom it has been alleged that Wagner had his last love affair) are spoken roles. The score uses electronic music as well as an ensemble of 24 musicians.

Premiere and performance history
The opera was premiered at the Grand Théâtre de Luxembourg in April 2007, prior to a run at the Westergasfabriek, Amsterdam, in a production by Pierre Audi for De Nederlandse Opera, which commissioned the work. Its British premiere took place at the Barbican Centre as a concert performance in London on 29 January 2012. The first British staged performance was given on 6 June 2013 in the Wales Millennium Centre Cardiff by Welsh National Opera, directed by Pierre Audi. In this production, German was used for the spoken text while the Buddhist characters sang in Pali. In a programme note, WNO's artistic director, David Pountney, stated that this change was discussed with Jonathan Harvey with the aim of "seeking to enhance and clarify the cultural dialogue which is the centrepiece of (Harvey's) opera".

Roles

Notes

Sources
"Acclaim for Harvey’s Wagner Dream", Faber Music News, Autumn 2007
 Harvey, Jonathan, (2008) "How do I compose? (Reflections on Wagner Dream)", in Circuit: musiques contemporaines, vol. 18, no. 1, pp. 38–43.

External links
 Wagner Dream - trailer by De Nederlandse Opera (2009)
Wagner Dream – podcast by Barbican Music, including extracts and interviews with conductor and cast. (2012)

Compositions by Jonathan Harvey
Operas
2007 operas
Operas set in Italy
Operas based on real people
Cultural depictions of Richard Wagner
English-language operas
Operas set in the 19th century